Events in the year 1927 in Spain.

Incumbents
Monarch: Alfonso XIII
President of the Council of Ministers: Miguel Primo de Rivera

Births
 March 31 - Eduardo Martínez Somalo, cardinal (d. 2021)
 May 8 - Josefina Samper, syndicalist and feminist (d. 2018)
 June 8 - Guillermo Luca de Tena, 1st Marquis of the Tena Valley (d. 2010)
 July 18 - Antonio García-Trevijano, republican, political activist, and author (d. 2018)
 October 14 - Juan Hidalgo Codorniu, composer, poet, action and visual artist (d. 2018)
 November 24 - Alfredo Kraus, operatic tenor (d. 1999)

Deaths

20 April - Enrique Simonet, artist (b. 1866)
5 November - Marceline Orbes, Spanish clown (b. 1873)

References

 
Years of the 20th century in Spain
1920s in Spain
Spain
Spain